Hieracium pangoriense is a species of flowering plant in the family Asteraceae that is endemic to Ecuador. Its natural habitat is subtropical or tropical moist montane forests. It is threatened by habitat loss.

References

pangoriense
Endemic flora of Ecuador
Flora of South America
Vulnerable plants
Taxonomy articles created by Polbot